In Codice Ratio is a research project designed to study and use novel techniques such as Optical Character Recognition and Artificial Intelligence to digitize works in the Vatican Apostolic Archive, most of which is handwritten.

History
In 2017, a project based in Roma Tre University called In Codice Ratio began using artificial intelligence and optical character recognition to attempt to transcribe more documents from the archives. While character-recognition software is adept at reading typed text, the cramped and many-serifed style of medieval handwriting makes distinguishing individual characters difficult for the software. Many individual letters of the alphabet are often confused by human readers of medieval handwriting, let alone a computer program. The team behind In Codice Ratio tried to solve this problem by developing a machine-learning software that could parse this handwriting. Their program eventually achieved 96% accuracy in parsing this type of text.

References

External links
 Official site

Research projects
Computer vision research infrastructure
Applications of artificial intelligence